Brevundimonas abyssalis is a Gram-negative, alkali tolerant, psychrotolerant, aerobic, dimorphic prosthecate and heterotrophic bacterium from the genus of Brevundimonas which has been isolated from deep-sea floor sediments from Japan.

References

External links
Type strain of Brevundimonas abyssalis at BacDive -  the Bacterial Diversity Metadatabase

Bacteria described in 2013
Caulobacterales